Präsidium des Bundes or Bundespräsidium (roughly chairmanship of the federation) was a title under the German Confederation (1815–1848, 1851–1866) whereby the Austrian delegate held the chair of the Federal Assembly.  Austria was thus called the presiding power.  This did not give Austria extra competencies: its delegate simply led the proceedings of the Federal Assembly.

Later, during the North German Confederation (1867–71), the same title was used for an office functioning as head of state. According to the constitution, the holder of this office was always the king of Prussia. The king was also Bundesfeldherr, federal commander-in-chief.  The constitutional changes of 1870–71 renamed the North German Confederation as the German Empire; the title and function of Bundespräsidium remained, but were now combined with the additional title Deutscher Kaiser.

Notes 

Titles of national or ethnic leadership
Legal history of Germany
North German Confederation
German Confederation